Guaraíta is a municipality in central Goiás state, Brazil.

Location
It is included in the Ceres Microregion and is bordered on the north and east by the municipalities of Itapuranga and on the west and south by Goiás.

Highway connections from Goiânia are made by GO-070 / Goianira / Itaberaí / GO-156 / Itapuranga / GO-525.  See Seplan.  The nearest major city is Goiás, 35 km. away.

Demographics
The population has been decreasing since 1980.  The urban population is slightly larger than the rural population:  
Urban population in 2007: 1,478
Rural population in 2007: 916

The economy
The economy is based on agriculture (rice, beans, manioc, corn, and bananas), and cattle raising (20,200 head in 2006.  There were 14 retail establishments.  There were 325 farms in 2006 with a total area of 15,285 hectares, of which 600 hectares were cropland.  There were 109 automobiles in 2007.

Health and education
The literacy rate was  82.9% in 2000 while the infant mortality rate was 33.15 in 1,000 live births.  There were only 2 schools with 718 students (2006).  There were no hospitals and only 4 doctors.

Rating on the Municipal Human Development Index
MHDI:  0.697
State ranking:  210 (out of 242 municipalities in 2000)
National ranking:  3,039 (out of 5,507 municipalities in 2000)

For the complete list see frigoletto.com.br

See also 
 List of municipalities in Goiás

References

Frigoletto

Municipalities in Goiás